Obed Itani Chilume Stadium  (also known as Francistown Sports Complex) is a multi-use stadium in Francistown, Botswana.

It is used mostly for football matches and usually hosts the home matches of Francistown giants TAFIC. The stadium has a capacity of 27,000 people. It was officially opened in 2015, 5 years later than planned. Due to delays, the stadium could not be completed in time for the 2010 World Cup as initially planned.

The stadium also hosts athletics meets for local high schools, as well as national trials and competitions.

References

External links
Stadium Pictures
Information on stadium

Football venues in Botswana
Buildings and structures in Francistown